Dereck Eugene Davis (born June 6, 1967) is an American politician serving as the Treasurer of Maryland since 2021. He is a former member of the Maryland House of Delegates from the 25th district.

Background
Delegate Davis was born in Washington, D.C., on June 6, 1967. He attended Central High School, Capitol Heights, Maryland and graduated from the University of Maryland with a B.A. in political science in 1989. He earned a master's degree in public policy in 1999. Davis has been an administrator with the Washington Suburban Sanitary Commission since  2004.

In the legislature
Davis was a member of House of Delegates from January 11, 1995 to 2021.  He was the Chairman of the House Economic Matters Committee.  He also chaired that committee's public utilities work group. He was a member of the Legislative Policy Committee and the Legislative Black Caucus of Maryland.

In the House of Delegates, Davis was Chair, Economic Matters Committee, 2003–2021 (public utilities subcommittee, 2003–2021, chair, 2003–10; alcoholic beverages subcommittee, 2011–2021). Member, Legislative Policy Committee, 2003–2021. Member, Environmental Matters Committee, 1995–2003 (environmental & natural resources subcommittee, 1995–99; chair, public utilities subcommittee, 1999–2003). Member, Maryland Economic Development and Business Climate Commission, 2014–2015; Special Committee on Gaming, 2001. Deputy Majority Whip, 1999–2002. Member, Joint Covid-19 Response Legislative Work Group, 2020-2021. Member, Bi-County Committee, Prince George's County Delegation, 2003–2005, 2013–2014,  2017–2021; chair, 1999–2002 (county affairs committee, 1995–1998, 2008; law enforcement & state-appointed boards committee, 2006–07, 2012, 2015–2016; Maryland-national capital park & planning commission committee, 2008–2011). Member, Legislative Black Caucus of Maryland (formerly Maryland Legislative Black Caucus), 1995–2021 (environmental committee, 2000); Maryland Bicycle and Pedestrian Caucus, 2003–2021. Member, National Conference of State Legislatures (energy & electric utilities committee, 2005–2007; agriculture, environment & energy committee, 2007–2008; agriculture & energy committee, 2008–2021; environment committee, 2008–2021).

Legislative notes
voted in for the Tax Reform Act of 2007 (HB2)
voted for the Healthy Air Act in 2006 (SB154)
Primary sponsor- Electricity - Universal Service Program (HB797/SB504) (Became law-chapter95)
voted for electric deregulation in 1999 (HB703)
voted for income tax reduction in 1998 (SB750)
voted in for the Tax Reform Act of 2007 (HB2)

Tenure as State Treasurer
In October 2021, Davis confirmed he would run for state treasurer following the retirement of Nancy Kopp. Maryland General Assembly elected Davis as the next state treasurer on December 9, 2021. He was sworn in on December 17, becoming the first state treasurer from Prince George’s County, and the second African-American to hold the position, after Richard N. Dixon.

Awards
2010 Most Influential Maryland Legislators (Top 20)

References

1967 births
20th-century African-American people
21st-century African-American politicians
21st-century American politicians
African-American state legislators in Maryland
Living people
Democratic Party members of the Maryland House of Delegates
People from Bowie, Maryland
People from Capitol Heights, Maryland
Politicians from Washington, D.C.
State treasurers of Maryland